The Tivoli Theater is a movie theater built in 1928 and is located at 5021 Highland Ave, Downers Grove, Illinois. The theater was designed by Van Gurten and Van Gurten architects, and has 1,012 seats. First opened on Christmas Day, 1928, this theater was the second in the US to open with sound movies (the first being the Brooklyn Paramount inaugurated in November). Since its opening the theater has been meticulously remodeled to resemble a "French Renaissance-style" theater. The Tivoli is a rare large one-screen theater. Most of these older theaters have been "cut up" in order to offer more screens, but the Tivoli is still intact. The building also includes a residential hotel, a bowling alley, and some other store fronts. It is operated by Classic Cinemas.

The theater shows both first- and second-run movies, and has live professional performances throughout the year. Bands that have performed include Los Lobos, Poi Dog Pondering, Big Head Todd and the Monsters, Neko Case, and The Wallflowers.  Owned by Classic Cinemas since 1976 this theater has an old look but new equipment.

References

Theatres completed in 1928
Buildings and structures in DuPage County, Illinois
Cinemas and movie theaters in Illinois
Downers Grove, Illinois
1928 establishments in Illinois
Public venues with a theatre organ